William Lathrop (April 17, 1825 – November 19, 1907) was a U.S. Representative from Illinois.

Born near Le Roy, New York, Lathrop attended the public schools and an academy at Brockport, New York.
He studied law in Attica, New York.
He moved to Knoxville, Illinois, and was admitted to the bar in 1850.
He settled in Rockford, Illinois, in 1851 and practiced his profession.
City clerk and city attorney of Rockford in 1852.
He served as member of the State house of representatives in 1856 and 1857.

Lathrop was elected as a Republican to the Forty-fifth Congress (March 4, 1877 – March 3, 1879).
He resumed the practice of law in Rockford, Illinois, where he died November 19, 1907.
He was interred in Greenwood Cemetery.

References

1825 births
1907 deaths
Republican Party members of the Illinois House of Representatives
Republican Party members of the United States House of Representatives from Illinois
People from Le Roy, New York
Politicians from Rockford, Illinois
19th-century American politicians